John Otterbein Snyder (August 14, 1867 – August 19, 1943) was an American ichthyologist and professor of zoology at Stanford University.

History
As a student he met David Starr Jordan who inspired him to enter zoology. He eventually became a zoology instructor at Stanford University and served there from 1899 until 1943. 

The same year he also declined the directorship there so he could return to Stanford. 

He was a long-term member of the California Academy of Sciences and worked for the California Bureau of Fisheries. He wrote many articles and papers as well as describing several new species of sharks.

San Francisco Bay
In 1905, Snyder, then Assistant Professor of Zoology at Stanford, published Notes on the fishes of the streams flowing into San Francisco Bay in Report of the Commissioner of Fisheries to the Secretary of Commerce and Labor for the fiscal year ending June 30, 1904. This work is significant in its historical documentation of the native fishes of San Francisco Bay channels.

Legacy
Snyder is honored in the name of the waspfish genus Snyderina.

See also
Taxa named by John Otterbein Snyder

References

Further reading

External links
 Stanford Memorial Page

American ichthyologists
1867 births
1943 deaths
Scientists from the San Francisco Bay Area
Stanford University faculty
People associated with the California Academy of Sciences
19th-century American zoologists
20th-century American zoologists